Towhidlu (also Romanized as Towḩīdlū) is a village in Qeshlaqat-e Afshar Rural District, Afshar District, Khodabandeh County, Zanjan Province, Iran. At the 2006 census, its population was 160, in 43 families.

References 

Populated places in Khodabandeh County